Dairyland is an unincorporated community in the town of Dairyland, Douglas County, Wisconsin, United States.

Wisconsin Highway 35 and County Road T are two of the main routes in the community.

The community is located 25 miles southwest of Solon Springs; 36 miles south of the city of Superior, and 20 miles northeast of Danbury.

References

Unincorporated communities in Douglas County, Wisconsin
Unincorporated communities in Wisconsin